Liolaemus antumalguen is a species of lizard in the family  Liolaemidae. It is native to Argentina.

References

antumalguen
Reptiles described in 2010
Reptiles of Argentina
Taxa named by Luciano Javier Ávila
Taxa named by Mariana Morando
Taxa named by Jack W. Sites Jr.